KSKF may refer to:

 KSKF (FM), a radio station (90.9 FM) licensed to Klamath Falls, Oregon, United States
 Lackland Air Force Base (ICAO code KSKF)
 Kelly Field Annex (ICAO code KSKF)